Yang Chen (born 1989 in Tianjin) is a Paralympian athlete from China competing mainly in category T37 sprint events.

Biography
Yang Chen competed in the 2004 Summer Paralympics in Athens, Greece.  He won a gold medal in the T37 100m and silver medals in the T37 200m, T37 400m and was part of the Chinese relay teams that won silver medals in both the T35-38 4 × 100 m and 4 × 400 m relays.  When the Paralympics took place in 2008 in his home country Yang Chen was not quite as busy only competing in the 200m and as part of the 4 × 100 m T35-38 team that won a silver medal.

References

Paralympic athletes of China
Athletes (track and field) at the 2004 Summer Paralympics
Athletes (track and field) at the 2008 Summer Paralympics
Paralympic gold medalists for China
Paralympic silver medalists for China
Living people
Medalists at the 2004 Summer Paralympics
Medalists at the 2008 Summer Paralympics
Year of birth missing (living people)
Paralympic medalists in athletics (track and field)
Chinese male sprinters
Paralympic sprinters
Medalists at the 2010 Asian Para Games